Eaton is a hamlet about  west of Oxford and about  northwest of Abingdon. Eaton is in the civil parish of Appleton-with-Eaton, which was part of Berkshire until the 1974 boundary changes transferred it to Oxfordshire.

History
Eaton is on a single-track road leading to the River Thames at Bablock Hythe, where there was an important vehicular ferry across the river. The village is built on land belonging to St John's College, Oxford.  St John's College, Oxford had the Manor House built in 1677 as a refuge from the Plague for dons. It is now a farmhouse and what had been five farms have been merged into two: Manor Farm and West Farm.

Amenities and public transport
Eaton has a public house, The Eight Bells, which has a darts team and an Aunt Sally team. A ghost called Libby is reputed to haunt the pub.

Oxfordshire County Council subsidised bus route 63 between Oxford and Southmoor serves Eaton five times a day in each direction from Monday to Friday. There is no service on Saturday, Sunday, or Bank Holidays. The current contractor operating the route is Thames Travel.

References

Source

Hamlets in Oxfordshire